Maha Vilattawa Grama Niladhari Division is a Grama Niladhari Division of the Chilaw Divisional Secretariat of Puttalam District of North Western Province, Sri Lanka. It has Grama Niladhari Division Code 570.

Maha Vilattawa is a surrounded by the Bingiriya, Vilattawa Palatha, Weerapandiyana, Elivitiya, Kanattawa, Punchi Vilattawa and Pulliyankadawara Grama Niladhari Divisions.

Demographics

Ethnicity 
The Maha Vilattawa Grama Niladhari Division has a Sinhalese majority (99.9%). In comparison, the Chilaw Divisional Secretariat (which contains the Maha Vilattawa Grama Niladhari Division) has a Sinhalese majority (82.4%)

Religion 
The Maha Vilattawa Grama Niladhari Division has a Buddhist majority (83.9%) and a significant Roman Catholic population (14.2%). In comparison, the Chilaw Divisional Secretariat (which contains the Maha Vilattawa Grama Niladhari Division) has a Roman Catholic plurality (45.7%) and a significant Buddhist population (36.6%)

References 

Grama Niladhari Divisions of Chilaw Divisional Secretariat